A multi-year rate plan (MRP) is an approved price (commonly known as the "rate") that public utilities will charge consumers over a multi-year period. As of 2019, 17 different states have used multi-year rate plans.

Background 
In the United States, electricity rates have traditionally been based on the utility's cost of delivering the electricity to its customers. The utility's overall cost of service (known as the "revenue requirement") is typically divided among various functions (such as electricity generation, transmission, distribution, etc.). Next, the revenue requirement gets allocated among various customer classes (residential, commercial, etc.). Finally, the rates are assigned to what are known as "billing determinants" that include charges such as peak power demand and fixed monthly fees.

The largest group of supporters of multi-year rate plans (MRPs) are the utilities themselves. One of the main arguments made by utility companies is that using MRPs makes the regulatory process better and helps the utilities' financial conditions. However, according to the National Regulatory Research Institute run by the National Association of Regulatory Utility Commissioners (NARUC), "From a regulatory perspective, their arguments seem to fall short of making a compelling case for how their customers would benefit."

In 2017, the Lawrence Berkeley National Laboratory (LBNL) issued a report saying that traditional ratemaking based on cost-of-service requires more frequent rate cases, and more frequent rate cases are correlated with lower quality utility productivity and higher customer costs.

A 2019 study published in the academic journal Utility Policy said that a multi-year rate plan can be ". . . more compatible with the public interest" as long as the plan is well structured, but that "substandard" multi-year rate plans ". . . can produce worse outcomes for utility customers."

Other countries, such as Australia, Canada and Great Britain, use MRPs more often than does the United States.

History 
In the mid-2000s, after a decade of a favorable business environment, American utility companies began experiencing price increases much quicker than before. As a result of those new pressures, ratemaking cases before state commissions began to become more frequent and in some cases, more contentious.

In many cases, when the utility applies for a MRP to its state regulator, it will request an increase for each year covered by the requested plan, but sometimes a utility will revise or lower its rate increase request. For example, in 1993, Connecticut Light and Power Company (now called Eversource Energy) reduced its proposed three-year rate increase in an amended request to state utility regulators.

In some cases, the utility regulators themselves encourage utilities to adopt a MRP. For example, in 2009, New York's utility regulator urged Con Edison to consider applying for a MRP when it approved a one-time, one-year rate increase of $523.4 million, saying that the one-year rate increase was not sufficient enough to meet all the challenges that Con Edison was facing.

Almost two decades earlier, in 1992, Con Ed had reached its ninth consecutive year of price freezes or cuts for its utility customers. However, faced with increased costs, Con Ed and the New York Public Service Commission made an agreement on a MRP to implement a 19.8 percent rate increase over a 3-year period.

State examples

North Carolina 
In 2019, a bill (Senate Bill 559) worked its way through the North Carolina legislature that would have allowed Duke Energy, one of the state's electric utilities, to have a multi-year rate for up to five years. Duke Energy argued that a multi-year plan would help the company pay for storm recovery and upgrades to the grid. However, legislators ended up removing the part of Senate Bill 559 that would have allowed multi-year rate plans for Duke Energy. Instead, the legislature kept in the provision of the bill that allows Duke to "recover storm-related costs." According to The News & Observer, the bill would allow Duke and other state utilities to use bonds to raise money to pay for storm recovery. (There was a bipartisan coalition in the state Senate that had approved the original bill, but members of the state House were not behind the original bill).

Colorado 
In 2011, the Colorado Public Utilities Commission approved a multi-year rate plan submitted by Xcel Energy. The MRP increased the base rate that Xcel could charge, firmly set the annual increase in base rates, consolidated authority to the state's commission for annual adjustments to base rates, and prohibited any additional increases in rates.

Hawaii 
In 2019, the Public Utilities Commission of Hawaii began conducting an investigative proceeding that looked into the consideration of a five-year multi-rate plan. Under the proposal, the state's utilities' rates would be based on revenue numbers set by the commission in an attempt to control costs and get savings for Hawaii's utility customers.

Maryland 
The Maryland Public Service Commission implemented a multi-year rate plan design that spread "rate changes over multiple years and [decreased] the administrative burden on regulators by staggering filings over several years.”

Minnesota 
According to the Minneapolis-based Star Tribune, Xcel Energy, which provides power to 1.3 million customers, requested a 3-year rate increase totaling 15.2% in 2019 with the Minnesota Public Utilities Commission.

New York 
In early 2019, Con Edison applied to the New York Public Service Commission to increase electric rates by $210 million in New York state in 2020. Under the plan, a typical New York City residential customer would see a monthly rate increase of $4.45 to $81.78, while a typical commercial customer would see a monthly increase of $80.96 to $1,970.67. Although Con Edison's application to the commission covered a single year, the company said it was having discussions with commissioners about a multi-year rate plan, which would lower the price increases to consumers.

See also 

Electric utility
Performance-based regulation
Public utility
Utility ratemaking

References

External links
 "A Guide to Utility Ratemaking." Pennsylvania Public Utility Commission. 2018.
"State Performance-Based Regulation Using Multiyear Rate Plans for U.S. Electric Utilities," U.S. Department of Energy, July 2017

Economics of transport and utility industries
Electric power
Public utilities
Public utilities of the United States